Sagar Homoeopathic Medical College & Hospital Research Center is a homeopathic college, situated in Sagar, Madhya Pradesh, and affiliated to Dr. Hari Singh Gour University (Sagar University), the director of the college goes by the name: Dr. P.K. Tamrakar. 

.

Established in 2002, the college offers bachelor's degree in the field of Homeopathic Medicine (BHMS) and is recognised by M.P. State Council of Homoeopathy, and Central Council of Homoeopathy, Government of India.

References

External links
Google plus
Homoeopathic Medical college in Sagar

Homeopathic colleges
Medical colleges in Madhya Pradesh
Education in Sagar, Madhya Pradesh
Educational institutions established in 2002
2002 establishments in Madhya Pradesh